Steven L. "Stevie" Crea (born July 18, 1947) is an American mobster and former underboss of the Lucchese crime family. In August 2020, he was sentenced to life imprisonment for murder and racketeering.

Lucchese crime family

Rise to power

Crea was inducted into the Lucchese crime family sometime in the 1980s, under the reign of boss Anthony Corallo. In 1990, family boss Victor Amuso promoted Crea to caporegime (captain), taking over Samuel "Sammy Bones" Castaldi's crew in the Bronx. Crea specialized in labor rackets, and gained power over Carpenter's Local 608, using it to extort New York City contractors. He also held a no-show job at Inner City Drywall, one of the city's largest drywall contractors and was involved with Local 282 of the Cement and Concrete Workers Union.

In 1993, with Amuso and Anthony Casso's support, Crea became underboss of the Lucchese family. Using his new clout, Crea shifted the family's power center away from the Brooklyn crews and back to the Bronx and Upper Manhattan crews which had historically controlled the family for decades. Durning the early 1990s, several Amuso/Casso loyalists, including George Zappola and Frank "Spaghetti Man" Gioia, Jr. had hatched a plot to kill Crea, and take over the family. They Brooklyn loyalists had planned to lure Crea to a sitdown (a mafia meeting) and then murder him. However, the plot fell through after Zapolla, Gioia, and the rest of Amuso/Casso faction were indicted and imprisoned.

Construction boss
From 1997 through 1999, Crea served as the head of the "Lucchese Construction Group", which also included Lucchese capos Dominic Truscello, head of the Prince Street crew, and Joseph Tangorra, head of a Brooklyn crew. The Construction Group brokered the bribes and "mob tax" payments to be received from contractors, and settled disputes over who would dominate a particular construction site. Also, the mobsters were placed on the company payroll so they could report legitimate taxable income to the U.S. Internal Revenue Service (IRS). During its existence, the Construction Group controlled over $40 million in construction contracts, increasing overall construction costs by 5%.

In 1998, after acting Lucchese boss Joseph DeFede was indicted on labor racketeering and extortion charges, Crea became the family's new acting boss.

In December 1999, Crea and Joseph Datello talked about bribery and extortion with Sean Richard, the son-in-law of John Riggi, the boss of the DeCavalcante crime family. It was later revealed that Richard was wearing a hidden recording device.

In 1999, it was revealed that Crea had formed an alliance with members of the Gambino crime family in extorting local officials of New York City's carpenters, laborers and bricklayers unions.

Guilty plea on corruption charges 
On September 6, 2000, Crea and other members of the Lucchese Construction Group were indicted in New York on state enterprise corruption, labor racketeering, extortion, and bid-rigging charges. The District Attorney charged that these schemes had systematically siphoned off millions of dollars from both public and private construction projects. Specifically, Crea used mob associates to extort building contractors who wished to receive rights to no-bid jobs or who wanted to reduce the number of union members on their payrolls. Crea's attorney was able to negotiate a favorable plea agreement which called for Crea to plead guilty to enterprise corruption and restraint of trade charges, and in January 2004 he received a 34-month prison sentence. Crea also pleaded guilty to similar federal charges and served both sentences concurrently.

Back to power 
On August 24, 2006, Crea was released from prison with parole restrictions that prohibited him from associating with other mobsters or union officials. On November 17, 2009, Crea's parole restrictions expired. Since his release it was speculated that he would take over the Lucchese crime family when his parole was up. In March 2010, the FBI observed at a Bronx social club Crea meeting with capo John Castellucci.

In July 2014, Jerry Capeci reported that Vic Amuso remains the official boss while Crea serves as acting boss. When the US attorneys office in Manhattan arrested him in 2017, they alleged he was the underboss of the family.

Racketeering indictment and life sentence

On May 31, 2017, Crea was indicted and held without bail for racketeering, fraud and murder conspiracy. The indictment built on charges previously filed against a reputed Lucchese soldier and associate in February 2017 with the murder of Michael Meldish in the Bronx on November 15, 2013; Matthew Madonna, Crea and his son Steven D. Crea, were charged and suspected of serving as co-conspirators in the Meldish gangland execution.

Crea is also accused of ordering the attempted murder of a Bonanno crime family associate. The FBI also accuses Crea of giving his approval for one of his underlings driving to New Hampshire in an attempt to find and murder an informant. Crea was personally charged with mail and wire fraud in connection of his skimming involvement with the construction of a New York City hospital.

On November 15, 2019, Crea, Madonna, Christopher Londonio and Terrence Caldwell were convicted in White Plains federal court of executing the murder of East Harlem Purple Gang leader Michael Meldish.

On August 27, 2020, Crea was sentenced to life in prison, along with a $400,000 fine and the forfeit of $1 million.

After Crea's 2020 imprisonment it was reported that Crea had been demoted as underboss as the word was that if he was convicted in the Michael Meldish murder case he would lose his position. As of October 2022, it was reported that Patrick Dellorusso has taken the reigns as underboss after previously serving as acting underboss.

References

Further reading 
Goldstock, Ronald, Martin Marcus and II Thacher. Corruption and Racketeering in the New York City Construction Industry: Final Report of the New York State Organized Crime Task Force. New York: NYU Press, 1990. 
Milhorn, H. Thomas. Crime: Computer Viruses to Twin Towers. Boca Raton, Florida: Universal Publishers, 2005. 
Raab, Selwyn. Five Families: The Rise, Decline, and Resurgence of America's Most Powerful Mafia Empires. New York: St. Martin Press, 2005.

External links 
Judge Hands Labor Racketeering Kingpin a Soft Sentence, Over Prosecutors' Complaints by Tom Robbins
Luchese Underboss and Captain Plead Guilty to Extortion Charges in Federal Court '' District Attorney of New York (October 1, 2003)

1947 births
Living people
Lucchese crime family
Place of birth missing (living people)
American gangsters of Italian descent
Acting bosses of the Five Families
American crime bosses
People convicted of corruption
People convicted of racketeering
Gangsters sentenced to life imprisonment
American people convicted of murder
Consiglieri
Gangsters from New York City
Criminals from the Bronx